Nahum ( or ;  Naḥūm) was a minor prophet whose prophecy is recorded in the Tanakh, also called the Hebrew Bible and The Old Testament. His book comes in chronological order between Micah and Habakkuk in the Bible. He wrote about the end of the Assyrian Empire, and its capital city, Nineveh, in a vivid poetic style.

Life
Little is known about Nahum's personal history. His name means "comforter," and he was from the town of Alqosh (Nahum 1:1), which scholars have attempted to identify with several cities, including the modern Alqosh in northern Iraq and Capernaum of northern Galilee. He was a very nationalistic Hebrew, however, and lived amongst the Elkoshites in peace. Nahum, called "the Elkoshite", is the seventh in order of the minor prophets.

Works

Nahum's writings could be taken as prophecy or as history. One account suggests that his writings are a prophecy written in about 615 BC, just before the downfall of Assyria, while another account suggests that he wrote this passage as liturgy just after its downfall in 612 BC.

The book was introduced in Reformation theologian Calvin's Commentary as a complete and finished poem:

There are indications that an acrostic underlies the present text. Thus 1:2 begins with the first letter of the alphabet (א), vs. 3b (‘in whirlwind’) with the second letter (ב), vs. 4 with the third (ג), and so on until from ten to sixteen of the twenty two letters have appeared. In places the scheme breaks down: in the process of transmission, what was once an alphabetic poem has now been seriously corrupted, rearranged, and supplemented.

Nahum, taking words from Moses himself, has shown in a general way what sort of "Being God is". Calvin argued that Nahum painted God by which his nature must be seen, and "it is from that most memorable vision, when God appeared to Moses after the breaking of the tablets."

Tomb

The tomb of Nahum is supposedly inside the synagogue at Alqosh, although there are other places outside Iraq which also lay claim to being the original "Elkosh" from which Nahum hailed. Alqosh was emptied of its Jewish population in 1948 when they were expelled after Israel was recognized as a Jewish nation, and the synagogue that houses the tomb is now in a poor structural state, to the extent that the tomb itself is in danger of destruction. The tomb underwent basic repairs in 1796. When all Jews were forced to flee Alqosh in 1948, the iron keys to the tomb were handed to an Assyrian man, Sami Jajouhana. Few Jews visit the historic site, yet Jajouhana continues to keep the promise he made with his Jewish friends, and looks after the tomb.

As of early 2017, the tomb was in significant disrepair and was threatened by the rise of ISIS in Iraq. A team of engineers conducted a survey of the tomb and determined that the tomb was in danger of imminent collapse and might not survive another winter. A team led by the U.S.-based non-profit Alliance for the Restoration of Cultural Heritage ("ARCH") raised the funds necessary to stabilize the site. After raising the necessary funds, ARCH partnered with the Prague-based GEMA ART International s.r.o., experts in historic preservation and reconstruction to do the immediate stabilization work. Following coordination with local partners, the initial stabilization work was completed in January, 2018. The stabilization work is expected to prevent further deterioration of the structure for between two and three years. With the tomb and its surrounding structure stabilized, ARCH is planning on raising the funding necessary to fully restore the site. On 26 April 2019, the United States government announced that it would contribute $500,000 to restore the tomb.

Two other possible burial sites mentioned in historical accounts are Elkesi, near Rameh in the Galilee and Elcesei in the West Bank.

Liturgical commemoration
The Prophet Nahum is venerated as a saint in Eastern Christianity. On the Eastern Orthodox liturgical calendar, his feast day is December 1 (for those churches which follow the traditional Julian Calendar, December 1 currently falls on December 14 of the modern Gregorian Calendar). He is commemorated with the other minor prophets in the Calendar of saints of the Armenian Apostolic Church on July 31.

References

External links

 
 Renovation - Al Qush Synagogue and the Tomb of Nahum
 Prophet Nahum Orthodox icon and synaxarion
 Unique Pictures Of Nahum Tomb By Kobi Arami

7th-century BC people
Christian saints from the Old Testament